The 1948 Cork Senior Hurling Championship was the 60th staging of the Cork Senior Hurling Championship since its establishment by the Cork County Board in 1887. The draw for the opening round fixtures was made at the Cork Convention on 25 January 1949. The championship began on 4 April 1948 and ended on 17 October 1948.

St. Finbarr's were the defending champions.

On 17 October 1948, Glen Rovers won the championship following a 5-7 to 3-2 defeat of Blackrock in the final. This was their 11th championship title overall and their first in three championships seasons.

Results

First round

Muskerry received a bye

Second round

Glen Rovers and Carrigdhoun received byes

Semi-finals

Final

References

Cork Senior Hurling Championship
Cork Senior Hurling Championship